Fadi Abou Chebel, OMM (born on 19 October 1969 in Deir al-Qamar, Lebanon) is the current Apostolic Exarch of the Maronite Catholic Apostolic Exarchate of Colombia.

Life

Fadi Abou Chebel joined the OMM of the Blessed Virgin Mary and on 19 January 1994 made his religious vows. He received on 23 December 1995, the sacrament of ordination to the priesthood.

On January 20, 2016 Chebel was appointed by Pope Francis Apostolic Exarch of Colombia.

References

External links

 http://www.catholic-hierarchy.org/bishop/bchebel.html

1969 births
Lebanese Maronites
Living people
Maronite Catholic Apostolic Exarchs